= 9beta-pimara-7,15-diene oxidase =

Class of enzymes

Identifiers
- EC no.: 1.14.13.144

Databases
- IntEnz: IntEnz view
- BRENDA: BRENDA entry
- ExPASy: NiceZyme view
- KEGG: KEGG entry
- MetaCyc: metabolic pathway
- PRIAM: profile
- PDB structures: RCSB PDB PDBe PDBsum
Search
- PMC: articles
- PubMed: articles
- NCBI: proteins

9beta-pimara-7,15-diene oxidase (EC 1.14.13.144, CYP99A3) is an enzyme with systematic name 9beta-pimara-7,15-diene,NADPH:oxygen 19-oxidoreductase. This enzyme catalyses the following chemical reaction

9beta-pimara-7,15-diene + 3 O_{2} + 3 NADPH + 3 H^{+} $\rightleftharpoons$ 9beta-pimara-7,15-dien-19-oate + 3 NADP^{+} + 4 H_{2}O (overall reaction)
(1a) 9beta-pimara-7,15-diene + O_{2} + NADPH + H^{+} $\rightleftharpoons$ 9beta-pimara-7,15-dien-19-ol + NADP^{+} + H_{2}O
(1b) 9beta-pimara-7,15-dien-19-ol + O_{2} + NADPH + H^{+} $\rightleftharpoons$ 9beta-pimara-7,15-dien-19-al + NADP^{+} + 2 H_{2}O
(1c) 9beta-pimara-7,15-dien-19-al + O_{2} + NADPH + H^{+} $\rightleftharpoons$ 9beta-pimara-7,15-dien-19-oate + NADP^{+} + H_{2}O

9beta-pimara-7,15-diene oxidase requires cytochrome P450.
